Preston-Potter Hollow is a census-designated place (CDP) in Albany County, New York, United States. The population was 366 at the 2010 census.

Preston and Potter Hollow are two hamlets in the town of Rensselaerville, located in the southwestern corner of Albany County. The communities are near the border of Greene County.

History
The Potter Hollow District No. 19 School and Sidney White House are listed on the National Register of Historic Places.

Geography
Preston-Potter Hollow is located at  (42.431357, -74.223113).

It is also the topographical location of Potter Hollow.

Demographics

As of the census of 2000, there were 374 people, 152 households, and 103 families residing in the CDP. The population density was 37.0 per square mile (14.3/km2). There were 235 housing units at an average density of 23.2/sq mi (9.0/km2). The racial makeup of the CDP was 94.65% White, 3.48% African American, 0.27% Asian, and 1.60% from two or more races. Hispanic or Latino of any race were 0.27% of the population.

There were 152 households, out of which 29.6% had children under the age of 18 living with them, 50.0% were married couples living together, 13.2% had a female householder with no husband present, and 32.2% were non-families. 27.0% of all households were made up of individuals, and 11.8% had someone living alone who was 65 years of age or older. The average household size was 2.46 and the average family size was 3.00.

In the CDP, the population was spread out, with 27.5% under the age of 18, 7.0% from 18 to 24, 21.9% from 25 to 44, 30.5% from 45 to 64, and 13.1% who were 65 years of age or older. The median age was 42 years. For every 100 females, there were 90.8 males. For every 100 females age 18 and over, there were 99.3 males.

The median income for a household in the CDP was $33,929, and the median income for a family was $37,188. Males had a median income of $32,708 versus $29,583 for females. The per capita income for the CDP was $16,679. About 7.6% of families and 10.2% of the population were below the poverty line, including 12.6% of those under age 18 and 7.4% of those age 65 or over.

References 

Census-designated places in New York (state)
Census-designated places in Albany County, New York